The legislative districts of Kalinga are the representations of the province of Kalinga in the various national legislatures of the Philippines. The province is currently represented in the lower house of the Congress of the Philippines through its lone congressional district.

History 

Prior to gaining separate representation, areas now under the jurisdiction of Kalinga were represented under the former Mountain Province (1917–1969) and Kalinga-Apayao (1969–1998). Kalinga became a separate province following the passage and subsequent ratification of Republic Act No. 7878 on May 8, 1995. In accordance with Section 9 of R.A. 7878 the new province began electing its own representative in the 1998 elections.

Beginning in 2019, the districts used in appropriation of members is coextensive with the legislative districts of Kalinga. Prior to 2019 when the province was just one congressional district, the Commission on Elections divided the province into two provincial board districts.

Lone District 
Population (2015): 212,680

See also 
Legislative districts of Mountain Province
Legislative district of Kalinga–Apayao

References 

Kalinga
Politics of Kalinga (province)